Clavans-en-Haut-Oisans is a commune in the Isère department in southeastern France.

Inhabitants of Clavans-en-Haut-Oisans are called Clavanchons (male) or Clavanchonnes (female).

Population

See also
Communes of the Isère department

References

Communes of Isère